Harry McCue (8 July 1957– ) is a former Irish association football player who alternately played as a defender and a midfielder. In a playing career spanning over 30 years, McCue represented Home Farm, Shamrock Rovers, Athlone Town A.F.C., Drogheda United and Dundalk in the League of Ireland. He also enjoyed spells in the United States, Northern Ireland, and Australia. Aa a player, he was a three-time winner of the League of Ireland.

Early career
McCue was raised on the Fruit Markets district of North Dublin where he began playing football with local team St Michans. His father had enjoyed a notable football career in the 1950s and '60s, lining out for Bohemians, Limerick and Waterford, in addition to representing Ireland amateurs. His sister Siobhan was a highly regarded player in women's football, while two of his cousins, Fran and Ray O'Brien, both represented Ireland at senior level and enjoyed lengthy careers in England and North America respectively. Harry McCue later joined Home Farm, spending eight years with their underage setup.

Home Farm, Shamrock Rovers and Athlone Town
Home Farm manager Dave Bacuzzi handed McCue his League of Ireland debut in the 1975-76 season. The following year he moved to Shamrock Rovers, then under Seán Thomas, for the 1976-77 season. However, the arrival of Johnny Giles, followed by a new set of players at Glenmalure Park, meant no first-team football for McCue. When Thomas took over at Athlone Town he was one of a number of ex-Hoops to end up at St Mel's Park.

The appointment of Turlough O'Connor as manager in 1979 signaled a renaissance at Athlone. The side won their eight opening games in the 1979-80 season, and won the 1979 Tyler Cup, beating Drogheda United 3-2. Over a four-year period McCue won two League Championships (1980-81 and 1982-83) and two League Cups (1981–82 and 1982–83) with Athlone. With Athlone, McCue made his debut in European football when he lined out for them in the 1981-82 European Cup, starting in both games as they drew 1-1 away and 2-2 at home to Danish side KB. The 3-3 aggregate scoreline meant that Athlone exited the tournament on away goals.

San Diego Sockers
During the summer of 1983, McCue was part of the roster of the North American Soccer League (NASL) team San Diego Sockers, wearing the number 6 and 19 shirts. In that era, with footballers often struggling to make ends meet, it was fairly commonplace for English and Irish-based players to spend the summer months playing in North America to earn extra cash. Consequently, McCue joined a number of international players in the NASL. His roommate over in San Diego legendary Polish player Kazimierz Deyna. McCue played one season with the Sockers in the 1983 NASL season, making five appearances and registering one goal and one assist. The Sockers would finish last in the Western Division.

Glentoran and Drogheda
After his summer stint with the Sockers, McCue joined Northern Irish League side Glentoran in Belfast. With the Glens he was a runner-up in the 1983-84 league season but won the Ulster Cup that same year. He lined out twice for Glentoran in the 1984-85 UEFA Cup, starting in both games as they drew 1-1 and then lost 2-0 away to Belgian giants Standard Liège. Prior to the first-leg, McCue had been blessed by the Reverend Ian Paisley.

After sustaining an ankle injury, he spent the last few months of the 1984-85 season on loan at Drogheda United but, in spite of the team boasting an impressive squad including McCue, Miah Dennehy, and Mick Fairclough, this didn't prevent the Boynesiders dropping into the newly-formed Division One.

Dundalk
In 1985, McCue was invited to join up again with Turlough O'Connor, recently arrived as manager with Dundalk, where he linked up with a number of former Athlone colleagues. After runners up spots in both League and FAI Cup in 1986-87, O'Connor added Paul Newe and Michael O'Connor to the squad for the following year.

The 1987-88 season saw Dundalk secure a remarkable League and Cup double. McCue played in the Cup final victory over Derry City.

Warringah Dolphins
The Cup final would be his last League of Ireland game. Shortly afterwards he emigrated to Australia and over the following nine years collected more honours, playing and coaching with Warringah Dolphins  in the New South Wales Super League.

During his three playing seasons he made 52 appearances, and he spent his remaining six seasons as a coach, initially as a youth coach and then first-team coach, landing the League and Cup Double in the 1994–95 season.

Management
When he returned to Ireland, Harry became assistant manager to Martin Lawlor at Drogheda United in October 1997. After nearly three years as assistant, McCue was appointed as Drogheda's manager in June 2000 but a horrific season that included financial constraints, poor gates, player wage cuts, all aggravated by the foot and mouth scare, ended with Drogheda in second-last place in the First Division and the ignominy of applying for re-election for the first time in its existence. The club's board stuck with McCue and he led the team to the 2001–02 League of Ireland First Division title and promotion to the Premier Division.

It took the play-offs before Drogheda held on to their Premier status at the end of the 2002-03 season but by August 2003, in the first League of Ireland 'Summer season', the prospect of another relegation dog-fight was on the horizon, and McCue was sacked, to be replaced by Paul Doolin.

Later life
McCue served Chairman of the Professional Footballers Association of Ireland (PFAI) from 1987 to 1988 and in 2003 he was elected as the first Chairman of the newly-formed Football Managers Association of Ireland. He spent two years with the Ireland U-18 squad as Assistant Manager to Sean McCaffrey and was also Assistant Manager to Noel King with the Ireland U-21 team.

Honours
Athlone Town
League of Ireland: 1980-81, 1982-83 
League of Ireland Cup: 1981–82, 1982–83
Tyler Cup: 1979

Dundalk
League of Ireland: 1987-88
FAI Cup: 1987–88
League of Ireland Cup: 1986–87

Glentoran
Ulster Cup: 1983–84

Drogheda United (as manager)
League of Ireland First Division: 2001–02 League of Ireland First Division

References

Republic of Ireland association footballers
Republic of Ireland expatriate association footballers
North American Soccer League (1968–1984) players
San Diego Sockers players
Home Farm F.C. players
Shamrock Rovers F.C. players
Dundalk F.C. players
Glentoran F.C. players
Drogheda United F.C. players
Athlone Town A.F.C. players
Expatriate soccer players in the United States
Irish expatriate sportspeople in the United States
Association football midfielders
1957 births
Living people